Kongorchok (- Konorchok) is a village in Ak-Talaa District, Naryn Region, Kyrgyzstan. It is situated near the right bank of the river Ala-Buga. Its population was 1,555 in 2021.

References

Populated places in Naryn Region